Uzh Hayrenyats, also known as Strength of the Fatherland or Strength of the Homeland is a political party in Armenia.

History
The Strength of the Fatherland party was founded on 3 April 2022 during a party congress held in Yerevan. During the congress, Tigran Arzakantsyan was elected as party Chairman while Arzakantsyan's wife, Natalia Rotenberg was elected as the chairperson of the supreme council. Arzakantsyan had previously served as a deputy in the National Assembly as a member of the Republican Party of Armenia. Prior to the 2021 Armenian parliamentary elections, Arzakantsyan announced his intent to participate in the elections with the Democratic Party of Armenia, but was disqualified by the Central Electoral Commission of Armenia from running for office as he was unable to meet residency requirements.

The party does not maintain any representation within the National Assembly and currently acts as an extra-parliamentary force.

On 6 June 2022, the party announced that Natalia Rotenberg would be nominated to run for Mayor of Yerevan in upcoming Yerevan City Council elections.

On 20 September 2022, Tigran Arzakantsyan held a meeting with Prime Minister of Armenia, Nikol Pashinyan. The sides discussed cooperation among extra-parliamentary groups.

Ideology
Tigran Arzakantsyan has pledged to collaborate with "patriots" across the country and the Armenian diaspora to find solutions to issues currently facing Armenia and Artsakh. On 18 March 2022, Arzakantsyan stated, "I appeal to you with a call for unity, let's unite around the Strength of the Fatherland party. Your participation will further strengthen and increase our common, unified National Force, which will become the guarantee of our long-term security, development and empowerment."

The party also supports fighting corruption, improving the quality of life for citizens, further developing the economy of the country, ensure secure borders, and modernize and strengthen the Armenian army.

See also

 Programs of political parties in Armenia

References

External links
 Strength of the Fatherland on Facebook

Political parties established in 2022
Political parties in Armenia